The discography of the American indie rock band Brainiac consists of 3 studio albums, two compilation albums, three EP's, six singles and two music videos.

Albums

Studio albums

Compilation albums

EPs

Singles 

 Superduperseven 7" (1992, Limited Potential)
 I Could Own You (Live) 7" (split single with Bratmobile, 1993, 12x12 Records)
 Dexatrim 7" (split single with Lazy, 1994, Simple Solution) (John Schmersal's debut as new guitarist)
 Cookie Doesn't Sing 7" (split single w/Today Is The Day, Chrome Cranks, and Steel Pole Bathtub Vol. 10/ CD Comp., 1995, Dope-Guns-'N-Fucking In The Streets Vols. 8–11, Amphetamine Reptile Records)
 Go! 4x7" single (Jabberjaw Vol. 6, CD Comp., 1996, Mammoth Records)
 Petrified single (Ubu Dance Party: A Tribute To Pere Ubu, CD Comp., 1997, Datapanik)

Filmography

Music Videos 

 "Strung" (1996)
 "Vincent Come on Down" (1996)

Films 

 Brainiac: Transmissions after Zero (2019)

References 

Discographies of American artists